Nikolas is a given name and a surname. Notable people with the name include the following:

Given name

Music
Nikolas Asimos (1949–1988), Greek composer and singer
Nikolas Caoile, American conductor
Nikolas Metaxas (born 1988), American singer and songwriter
Nikolas Papamitrou (born 1995), American hip hop record producer known by his stage name Papamitrou
Nikolas Schreck, American singer/songwriter, musician, author, film-maker and Tantric Buddhist religious teacher
Nikolas Sideris (born 1977), Greek composer
Nikolas Kostantinos Venetoulis (1936–1998), American record producer known as Nick Venet

Sports
Nikolas Asprogenous (born 1986), Cypriot footballer 
Nikolas Berger (born 1974), Austrian beach volleyball player
Nikolas Besagno (born 1988), American soccer player
Nikolas Gelavis (born 1929), Australian rules footballer known as Nick Gelavis
Nikolas Ketner (born 1991), Czech ice hockey player
Nikolas Ledgerwood (born 1985), Canadian soccer player
Nikolas Lewis (born 1982), American gridiron football player and coach known as Nik Lewis
Nikolas Maes (born 1986), Belgian road bicycle racer
Nikolas Matinpalo (born 1998), Finnish ice hockey player
Nikolas Mattheou (born 1998), Cypriot footballer 
Nikolas Nartey (born 2000), Danish footballer
Nikolas Nicolaou (born 1979), Cypriot football player
Nikolas Panagiotou (born 2000), Cypriot footballer
Nikolas Petrik (born 1984), Austrian ice hockey player
Nikolas Proesmans (born 1992), Belgian footballer
Nikolas Špalek (born 1997), Slovak footballer
Nikolas Stauskas (born 1993), Canadian basketball player known as Nik Stauskas
Nikolas Sylvester (born 2000), Vincentian swimmer
Nikolas Tsattalios (born 1990), Australian footballer
Nikolas Wallenda (born 1979), American acrobat known as Nik Wallenda
Nikolas Wamsteeker (born 1996), Canadian ice dancer

Other professions
Nikolas Gvosdev (born 1969), Russian international relations scholar
Nikolas Kompridis (born 1953), Canadian philosopher and political theorist
Nikolas Kozloff (born 1969), American author 
Nikolas Löbel (born 1986), German politician
Nikolas Ormaetxea (1888–1961), Spanish writer
Nikolas Papadopoulos (born 1973), Cypriot politician
Nikolas Patsaouras (born 1943), American urban planner known as Nick Patsaouras
Nikolas Rose (born 1947), British sociologist
Nikolas Schiller (born 1980), American blogger
Nikolas Sigurdsson Paus (mentioned 1329–1347), Norwegian nobleman
Nikolas Tsakos (born 1963), Greek shipowner
Nikolas Vogel (1967–1991), Austrian film actor

Other
Nikolas Cruz (born 1998), American mass murderer facing a life sentence.

Fictional characters
Nikolas Cassadine, from American soap opera ''General Hospital'

Middle name
Karl Nikolas Fraas (1810–1875), German botanist and agriculturist
Olaf Nikolas Olsen (1794–1848), Danish military officer

Surname
Alexa Nikolas (born 1992), American actress

See also

Nicolas (disambiguation)
Nickolas
Niklas (name)
Nikola
Nikolai (disambiguation)
Nikolaj

Masculine given names